Emily Chang may refer to:

 Emily Chang (actress) (born 1980), American actress
 Emily Chang (journalist) (born 1980), American journalist